Cédric Joly (born 25 January 1995) is a French slalom canoeist who has competed at the international level since 2012.

He won a gold medal in the C1 event at the 2019 ICF Canoe Slalom World Championships in La Seu d'Urgell. He also won a gold and a silver medal in the C1 team event at the European Championships.

References

External links

1995 births
Living people
Medalists at the ICF Canoe Slalom World Championships
French male canoeists